Gilbert "Gib" Parent  (July 25, 1935 – March 3, 2009) was a Canadian member of Parliament. He is best known in his role as speaker of the House of Commons of Canada between 1994 and 2001.

Parent was born on July 25, 1935, in Mattawa, Ontario, and his janitor father, a Mattawa-born Metis, moved the young family to Welland, Ontario. He went to St. Joseph's College on a football scholarship, and earned a teaching certificate from the Ontario College of Education.

Prior to his election to the House of Commons, he worked as a teacher and was vice-principal at Thorold Secondary School.

Political career

Parent was elected to Parliament six times as a member of the Liberal Party of Canada. He was first elected in the 1974 election representing the riding of St. Catharines.  He was re-elected in the 1979, 1980. Parent was defeated in the 1984 election as Brian Mulroney's Progressive Conservative Party swept to power, but regained his seat four years later in 1988, and was re-elected in the 1993 and 1997 elections.

His riding's name was subsequently changed to Welland, then Welland—St. Catharines—Thorold and finally Niagara Centre. Under Prime Minister Pierre Trudeau, Parent served, at different times between 1977 and 1981, as Parliamentary Secretary to the Minister of Veterans Affairs, to the Minister of Labour and to the Minister of State (Sports).

Parent was first elected Speaker in January 1994. In the House, Parent was forced into the challenge of presiding over a five-party Parliament that resulted from the emergence of the Bloc Québécois and the Reform Party. Upon being re-elected to the position in September 1997, he told the Montreal Gazette that he expected the different voices in Parliament, informed by strong opinions on all sides, would make the House the lively place it should be.

Parent died at Mount Sinai Hospital in Toronto at the age of 73 of pneumonia while recovering from colon cancer surgery. He is survived by his brothers, Gerald Parent and Romeo Parent, wife of 39 years, Joan Parent (née Davis), their 4 daughters, Michele (Dave) Hundertmark, Monique (John) Finley, Madeleine (Mark) Thomas, and Terri (Sandro) Perruzza and 13 grandchildren, and partner Sandra Page, 2 daughters and 1 grandchild.

Electoral record

|-

|Liberal
|PARENT, Gilbert
|align="right"|25,534
|53.97%

|Reform
|JOHNSTONE, Don
|align="right"| 11,901
|25.15%

|Progressive Conservative
|ST. AMAND, Terry
|align="right"| 5,472
|11.56%

|New Democratic Party
|DOBRUCKI, Rob
|align="right"|3,737
|7.89%

|Natural Law
|AMOS, Laureen
|align="right"|311
|0.66%

|Abolitionist
|DOUCET, Leonard
|align="right"|64
|0.14%

|-

|Liberal
|PARENT, Gilbert
|align="right"|17,878
|    

|Progressive Conservative
|PIETZ, Allan
|align="right"|16,287
|

|New Democratic Party
|LEE, Ken
|align="right"|12,646
|

|No affiliation
|WALKER, Ron
|align="right"|71
|

|Communist
|WALLIS, David
|align="right"|57
|

Archives 
There is a Gilbert Parent fonds at Library and Archives Canada.

References

External links
 

Speakers of the House of Commons of Canada
Members of the House of Commons of Canada from Ontario
Members of the King's Privy Council for Canada
Franco-Ontarian people
1935 births
2009 deaths
Deaths from pneumonia in Ontario
People from Mattawa, Ontario